Oleksandrivka is an urban-type settlement in Donetsk Oblast in eastern Ukraine. According to Ukraine, which does not control the settlement, it is located in Donetsk Raion; according to Russia, which illegally occupies the territory, it is administered under Marinka Raion. Population:

Demographics
Native language as of the Ukrainian Census of 2001:
 Ukrainian 94.22%
 Russian 5.54%
 Belarusian 0.05%
 Others 0.02%

References

Urban-type settlements in Donetsk Raion